Claudia Peczinka (born 21 January 1968) is a former synchronized swimmer from Switzerland.

References 

1968 births
Living people
Swiss synchronized swimmers
Olympic synchronized swimmers of Switzerland
Synchronized swimmers at the 1988 Summer Olympics
Synchronized swimmers at the 1992 Summer Olympics